Oak Tree or oaktree may refer to:

 Oak tree, a tree or shrub in the genus Quercus
 An Oak Tree, a 1973 conceptual work of art by Michael Craig-Martin
 Oak Tree, County Durham, a village in County Durham, England
 Oak Tree Village, California, an unincorporated community in El Dorado County
 Oak Tree, New Jersey, an unincorporated community in Middlesex County
 Oaktree Capital Management, a global asset management firm
 The Oaktree Foundation, a youth-run aid and development agency
 Oak Tree Press, a small not-for-profit publishing house
 Oak Tree National, a golf club in Edmond, Oklahoma
 Oak Tree Grand Prix, a sports car race held at the Virginia International Raceway in Alton, Virginia
 Oaktree Arena, a speedway racing track located near Highbridge, Somerset, England
 OakTree Software, software developers of the Bible study program Accordance
 "The Oak Tree," a song by Morris Day

Horse racing 
 Oak Tree Stakes, a flat horse race in Great Britain
 Oak Tree Racing Association, a corporation that promotes Thoroughbred horse racing in Southern California, several races at Santa Anita Park including:
 Oak Tree Derby, a race for thoroughbred horses run at Santa Anita Park
 Oak Tree Mile Stakes, a former name of the City of Hope Stakes, a Thoroughbred horse race at Santa Anita Park
 Oak Tree Invitational Stakes, or Oak Tree Stakes, a former name of the John Henry Turf Championship Stakes

See also
Oak (disambiguation)